Allyn Bromley (born 1928) is an American printmaker and art educator who was born in San Francisco.  She first came to Hawaii in 1952, and subsequently moved to Waikiki, where she lived for nine years.  From 1961 to 1965, she lived in Europe, returning to Hawaii in 1965.  She received a BFA from the University of Hawaii at Manoa in 1968 and an MFA from the University of Colorado Boulder in 1971.

She began her teaching career at Leeward Community College in 1972, where she taught until 1983.  She became director of the Printmaking Department at the University of Hawaii at Manoa in 1983, and retired as a professor emeritus in 2000.

Bromley works primarily in screen printing.  Since the late 1980s, she has been combining printing with painting, drawing, and collaging.  Breakfast Buddha, from 2004, is an example of her mixed-media prints.  As in much of her portrait work, the subject's silhouette is emphasized, and facial details are minimized.  The Hawaii State Art Museum and the Honolulu Museum of Art are among the public collections holding work by Allyn Bromley.

References
 Clarke, Joan and Diane Dods, Artists/Hawaii, Honolulu, University of Hawaii Press, 1996, pp. 8–13
 Fujii, Jocelyn, The Persis Collection of Contemporary Art, Honolulu, Goodale Publishing, 1998, pp. 44, 46, 54–55, 95, 104, 112
 Hartwell, Patricia L. (editor), Retrospective 1967-1987, Hawaii State Foundation on Culture and the Arts, Honolulu, Hawaii, 1987, p. 26
 Maui Arts & Cultural Center, Schaefer Portrait Challenge, 2015, Maui Arts & Cultural Center, 2015, p. 12
 Morse, Marcia, Honolulu printmakers 75th Anniversary, A Tradition of Gift Prints, Honolulu, HI, Honolulu Academy of Arts, 2003, p. 84
 Morse, Marcia and Allison Wong, 10 Years: The Contemporary Museum at First Hawaiian Center, The Contemporary Museum, Honolulu, 2006, p. 23
 Oshiro, Joleen, "Bromley is Ideal Printmaker, June 13, 2010
 Wisnosky, John and Tom Klobe, A Tradition of Excellence, University of Hawai'i, Honolulu, 2002, pp. 24–27
 Wong, Allison, 10 Years - The Contemporary Museum at First Hawaiian Center - Tenth Anniversary Exhibition, The Contemporary Museum, Honolulu, Hawaii, 2006, p. 23
 Zuern, John David, Finding Latitude: The Work of Allyn Bromley, The Contemporary Museum, Honolulu, 2010,

Footnotes

1928 births
Living people
American printmakers
American women artists
Hawaii artists
Printmakers from Hawaii
University of Hawaiʻi at Mānoa alumni
University of Colorado Boulder alumni
American women printmakers
21st-century American women